Polyphaenis is a genus of moths of the family Noctuidae.

Species
 Polyphaenis hemiphaenis Boursin, 1970
 Polyphaenis monophaenis Brandt, 1938
 Polyphaenis propinqua Staudinger, 1895
 Polyphaenis sericata (Esper, [1787])
 Polyphaenis subviridis (Butler, 1878)

References
Natural History Museum Lepidoptera genus database
Polyphaenis at funet

Hadeninae